François de Franquetot de Coigny (16 March 1670 – 18 December 1759) was a Marshal of France, Count, and from 1747, the Duke of Coigny.

He was born in the Coigny château near Coutances, Normandy as son of Robert-Jean de Coigny, and Marie-Françoise de Matignon. His uncle was Charles-Auguste de Goyon-Matignon, Marshal of France and his nephew Jacques I, Prince of Monaco. Like his father he pursued a military career. He became brigadier in 1702, Maréchal de camp in 1703 and lieutenant general in 1709.

His most notable victories were at San Pietro and Guastalla, which he won in 1734 together with Marshal de Broglie against the Austrians in the War of Polish Succession. He was made a Marshal of France in 1734. In the War of the Austrian Succession he replaced Marshal de Broglie in 1743 to defend the French positions on the Rhine.

In the 1720s he was a member of the Club de l'Entresol, an early modern think tank.

Family
He married Henriette de Montbourcher du Bordage on 4 December 1699; they had three children:
Marie-Françoise (1700–17??)
Jean, marquis de Coigny (1702–1748; killed in a duel)
Charlotte-Bibiane (1703–1772)

His grandson was François-Henri de Franquetot de Coigny, also a Marshal of France.

Notes

External links
 Genealogy of Franquetot
  House of Franquetot
  History of the Franquetot family

1670 births
1759 deaths
People from Manche
Counts of France
Dukes of Coigny
French soldiers
Marshals of France
French military personnel of the War of the Spanish Succession
French military personnel of the War of the Polish Succession
French military personnel of the War of the Austrian Succession
Knights of the Golden Fleece of Spain